Febvre resp. Le Febvre may refer to:

People 

 Antoine Lefèbvre de La Barre (1622–1688), Governor of New France from 1682 to 1685 
 Frédéric Febvre (1835–1916), French actor
 Yves Le Febvre (1874-1959), leftist and anticlerical Breton writer and politician
 Lucien Febvre (1878-1956), French historian and encyclopaedist

Places 

 Baie-du-Febvre, Quebec

See also 

 Lefebvre
 Nicasius le Febure
 Lefèvre

French-language surnames